The fundamental theorems of asset pricing (also: of arbitrage, of finance), in both financial economics and mathematical finance, provide necessary and sufficient conditions for a market to be arbitrage-free, and for a market to be complete. An arbitrage opportunity is a way of making money with no initial investment without any possibility of loss. Though arbitrage opportunities do exist briefly in real life, it has been said that any sensible market model must avoid this type of profit. The first theorem is important in that it ensures a fundamental property of market models. Completeness is a common property of market models (for instance the Black–Scholes model). A complete market is one in which every contingent claim can be replicated. Though this property is common in models, it is not always considered desirable or realistic.

Discrete markets
In a discrete (i.e. finite state) market, the following hold:
The First Fundamental Theorem of Asset Pricing: A discrete market on a discrete probability space  is arbitrage-free if, and only if, there exists at least one risk neutral probability measure that is equivalent to the original probability measure, P.
The Second Fundamental Theorem of Asset Pricing: An arbitrage-free market (S,B) consisting of a collection of stocks S and a risk-free bond B is complete if and only if there exists a unique risk-neutral measure that is equivalent to P and has numeraire B.

In more general markets

When stock price returns follow a single Brownian motion, there is a unique risk neutral measure.   When the stock price process is assumed to follow a more general sigma-martingale or semimartingale, then the concept of arbitrage is too narrow, and a stronger concept such as no free lunch with vanishing risk must be used to describe these opportunities in an infinite dimensional setting.

See also
Arbitrage pricing theory
Asset pricing

Rational pricing

References
Sources

Further reading

External links
 http://www.fam.tuwien.ac.at/~wschach/pubs/preprnts/prpr0118a.pdf

Financial economics
Mathematical finance
Corporate development